João Ricardo da Silva Afonso (born 28 May 1990) is a Portuguese professional footballer who plays for S.C.U. Torreense as a central defender.

Club career

Vitória Guimarães
Born in Castelo Branco, Afonso started playing with local Sport Benfica e Castelo Branco, after joining its youth system in 2007. He went on to spend several seasons with the club in the lower leagues, also being awarded team captaincy.

On 20 June 2014, after being linked with C.S. Marítimo and Gil Vicente FC, Afonso signed with fellow Primeira Liga side Vitória de Guimarães. He made his debut as a professional on 22 August of that year, replacing the injured Moreno midway through the first half of an eventual 3–0 home win against F.C. Penafiel.

Afonso joined G.D. Estoril Praia also from the top division on 31 August 2016, in a season-long loan deal. The following 9 July, still owned by Vitória, he moved abroad after agreeing to a one-year loan with Córdoba CF in the Spanish Segunda División.

Santa Clara
In late June 2019, Afonso left the Estádio D. Afonso Henriques and joined C.D. Santa Clara on a three-year contract.

References

External links

1990 births
Living people
People from Castelo Branco, Portugal
Sportspeople from Castelo Branco District
Portuguese footballers
Association football defenders
Primeira Liga players
Liga Portugal 2 players
Segunda Divisão players
Sport Benfica e Castelo Branco players
Vitória S.C. players
Vitória S.C. B players
G.D. Estoril Praia players
C.D. Santa Clara players
S.C.U. Torreense players
Segunda División players
Córdoba CF players
Portuguese expatriate footballers
Expatriate footballers in Spain
Portuguese expatriate sportspeople in Spain